Firehead is a 1991 science fiction–thriller film.  It was directed by Peter Yuval for Action International Pictures, and stars Chris Lemmon and Christopher Plummer.  It was filmed in Mobile, Alabama and released theatrically in 1991.

Plot
In 1988, a telekinetic Soviet agent known as "Firehead" (Brett Porter) defects to the west after refusing to use his powers against Estonian protesters. Two years later, he begins blowing up American munitions factories for unknown reasons. An NIH chemist (Chris Lemmon) and a government assassin (Gretchen Becker) are ordered to track him down. Meanwhile, a secret society led by Colonel Vaughn (Christopher Plummer) prepares to use Firehead's activities as a pretext for a coup d'état.

Reception
According to Kevin Thomas of the Los Angeles Times, the film is "as inept and dismal a political thriller as you would never wish to watch", though he praised certain members of the cast, in particular the cameo appearance by Martin Landau.

In 2013, it was the subject of a RiffTrax commentary track featuring Michael J. Nelson, Bill Corbett, and Kevin Murphy. The trio directed much of their mockery toward Chris Lemmon, who was compared unfavorably to his more famous father.

References

External links
 

1991 action thriller films
1991 films
Action International Pictures films
American political thriller films
American science fiction action films
Cold War films
Films about telekinesis
Films set in 1988
Films set in 1990
Films set in Estonia
Films set in the United States
Films shot in Mobile, Alabama
1990s science fiction action films
1990s English-language films
1990s American films